Bradysia ocellaris is a species of fly in the family Sciaridae. It is found in the Palearctic. It has also been introduced to Australia. It feeds on fungi, and larvae can feed on cultivated plants in greenhouses.

References

Sciaridae
Insects described in 1882
Insect pests of ornamental plants
Palearctic insects